The Diocese of Mbhashe is a diocese of the Anglican Church of Southern Africa situated in the Eastern Cape province of South Africa. It was established on 16 December 2010 out of part of the Diocese of Mthatha. The cathedral is All Saints Church in Ngcobo while the diocesan office is in Butterworth. The diocese includes the areas of Cala, Cofimvaba, Dutywa, Elliot, Kentani and Tsomo. The first and current bishop is Sebenzile Elliot Williams.

References

2010 establishments in South Africa
Anglican Church of Southern Africa dioceses
Anglican bishops of Mbhashe
Eastern Cape